Nigerians or the Nigerian people are citizens of Nigeria or people with ancestry from Nigeria. The name Nigeria was taken from the Niger River running through the country. This name was allegedly coined in the late 19th century by British journalist Flora Shaw, who later married Baron Frederick Lugard, a British colonial administrator. Nigeria is composed of various ethnic groups and cultures and the term Nigerian refers to a citizenship-based civic nationality. Nigerians derive from over 250 ethno-linguistic groups. Though there are multiple ethnic groups in Nigeria, economic factors result in significant mobility of Nigerians of multiple ethnic and religious backgrounds to reside in territories in Nigeria that are outside their ethnic or religious background, resulting in the mixing of the various ethnic and religious groups, especially in Nigeria's cities. The English language is the lingua franca of Nigerians. Nigeria is divided roughly in half between Muslims, who live mostly in the north, and Christians, who live mostly in the south; indigenous religions, such as those native to the Igbo and Yoruba ethnicities, are in the minority.

Ethnicity 

Nigerians come from multiple ethnic and religious backgrounds as the founding of Nigeria was the outcome of a colonial creation by the British Empire.

History 

There have been several major historical states in Nigeria that have influenced Nigerian society via their kings and their legal and taxation systems, and the use of religion to legitimize the power of the king and to unite the people. Northern Nigeria has been culturally influenced by Islamic influence including several major historic Islamic states in the region. The Kanem-Bornu Empire and the Sokoto Caliphate were major historical Islamic states in northern Nigeria. Southern Nigeria historically held several powerful states, including the Benin Empire and Oyo Empire, Ife Confederacy and several other Yoruba states.

Culture 
Nigerian culture was profoundly affected by the British colonial rule. Such as British colonial authorities denouncement and attacks upon polygamy, trial by ordeal, and certain types of sacrifices. At the same time, British colonial authorities maintained and promoted traditional Nigerian culture that strengthened colonial administration. The British spread Christianity throughout southern Nigeria and Christian missionaries assisted British authorities in establishing a Western-style education system in Nigeria that resulted in the teaching of the English language in Nigeria and its subsequent adoption as Nigeria's main language. The British replaced unpaid household labor with wage labor. Prior to colonisation in the twentieth century, Nigeria's tribes usually possessed the land as a community, such that land could not be bought or sold. Colonisation brought the notion of individuals owning land and commercialisation of land began.

In Nigeria, more than seventy percent of Nigerians live in villages of two different types: the first type used by the Igbo and Tiv involves a collection of dispersed compounds while the second type used amongst the Hausa fulani, Yoruba, and Kanuri involves nuclei of compounds. These villages compose members of the ethnicity-related through ancestry as well as strangers who have been assimilated into the ethnicity. Since the time prior to colonisation to the present it has been a common practice of Nigeria's tribes to adopt strangers into the tribes. A male elder in the community commonly serves as a village chief or Baale.

In the large cities of Nigeria, there is a substantial intermingling of Nigerians with foreigners, especially Europeans, Lebanese, and Indians. The economic importance of Nigeria's cities has resulted in migrations of people from their traditional ethnic or cultural homeland to cities outside those territories. Igbo, Hausa-Fulani and Ibibio people have commonly migrated to Lagos and many southerners migrate to the north to trade or work while a number of northern seasonal workers and small-scale entrepreneurs go to the south.

Religion 

 Muslim 53.5%
 Roman Catholic 11.2%
 Other Christian 34.7%
 Traditionalist 5.9%
 Unspecified 0.5%

Sectarianism 
Ethnic, religious, and regional disputes and tensions have commonly divided Nigerians on political issues. In particular, cultural and political divisions between the Muslim north and the Christian south has politicised religion and caused significant political disputes in Nigeria. Ethnic-motivated and religious-motivated violence by extremists has increased these tensions as well.

However, despite instances of extremism, most Nigerians continue to peacefully coexist, and a common Nigerian identity has been fostered amongst the more-educated and affluent Nigerians as well as with the many Nigerians who leave small homogeneous ethnic communities to seek economic opportunities in the cities where the population is ethnically mixed. Although there are cultural divisions amongst Nigerians, the English language is commonly used as their primary language. Also, most Nigerians share a strong commitment to individual liberties and democracy. Even during periods of military rule, such military governments were pressured to maintain democratic stances by the Nigerian people. Nigeria's political figures commonly know multiple indigenous languages outside their own indigenous language.

See also

 British Nigerian
 Demographics of Nigeria
 Nigerian Americans
 List of Nigerians

References

External links

 
Ethnic groups in Nigeria